Attinas was a Macedonian phrourarchos of a fort in Bactria (329 – 328 BC). The fort was attacked by the Sogdian general Spitamenes and a force of Massagetae, who lured Attinas and his 300 cavalrymen into an ambush and slaughtered them.

References
Who's who in the age of Alexander the Great: prosopography of Alexander's empire 

Ancient Greek generals
Phrourarchs of Alexander the Great
Ancient Macedonian generals
Ancient Macedonians killed in battle
4th-century BC Macedonians
Year of birth unknown
328 BC deaths